KCME (88.7 MHz) is an independent, listener-supported public radio station in Colorado Springs, Colorado, serving the Colorado Springs - Pueblo radio market.  It is owned by Cheyenne Mountain Public Broadcast House, Inc., and airs a classical music radio format. Its slogan is "Local. Classical. Cultural".  KCME's studios and administrative offices are at 1921 N. Weber Street in Colorado Springs.  Its main broadcasting tower is on Cheyenne Mountain. KCME may be heard worldwide via internet streaming on www.kcme.org. KCME also broadcasts in the HD Radio digital format.

Jazz 93.5
KCME programs a wide variety of jazz on its HD-2 subchannel, which also feeds a translator station, 93.5 MHz K228EM.  It is branded as Jazz 93.5, and is a sister station of KCME.  Originally KCME aired jazz on Saturday mornings and Saturday evenings during the first 26 years it was on the air.  In the 1990s, KCME also had Jazz during the overnight hours in the summer months.

KCME dropped jazz programming in 2007 to focus on its main classical music programming due in part to Colorado Public Radio's classical service having a translator in Colorado Springs which was eventually closed down.  In addition, both CPR Classical and KCME broadcast the Metropolitan Opera on Saturdays, previously sandwiched for many years between the jazz blocks on KCME.  When HD technology made it possible, KCME created a full-time jazz service on its HD-2 subchannel in late October 2017, coupled with a translator station.  Jazz 93.5 is also heard worldwide via internet streaming on www.jazz935.org.  Its slogan is "In the Moment".

History
KCME signed on for the first time on December 24, 1979, on its original frequency of 88.1 MHz.  It was founded by Charles M. Edmonds, who also served as the president and chief engineer.  The station's call sign is made up of Edmonds' initials, C.M.E.  KCME's offices and studios were on Minnehaha Avenue in Manitou Springs.

In 1990, KCME moved to its current dial position at 88.7 MHz.  Another station replaced KCME at 88.1, KTPL, a Christian radio outlet in nearby Pueblo, Colorado.  In the mid 1990s, KCME's studios and offices moved to facilities in Colorado Springs, although the station is still identified on the air as "KCME, Manitou Springs."

Satellite stations
KCME maintains several satellite stations for its classical programming:  Full powered KMPZ in Salida (200 watts), along with translators K208DP 89.5 MHz in Nathrop (100 watts) and K216EF 91.1 FM Florence (100 watts).  In July 2008, KCME was invited by Summit Public Radio and TV, Inc. to relay its signal to Summit County (Breckenridge, Dillon, Frisco and Silverthorne) on 89.3 MHz.

References

External links
KCME website
Jazz 93.5 website

CME
Classical music radio stations in the United States
Manitou Springs, Colorado
NPR member stations
Radio stations established in 1977
1977 establishments in Colorado